Salman Mazahiri (10 October 1946 – 20 July 2020) was an Indian Muslim scholar who served as chancellor of Mazahir Uloom Jadeed.

Early life and education
Mazahiri was born on 10 October 1946. Aged 15, he entered Mazahir Uloom, Saharanpur in 1962 (1381 AH) and graduated in 1386 AH. He studied Sahih Bukhari with Muhammad Zakariyya Kandhlawi, Sahih Muslim, Sunan Nasai, Tirmidhi with Munawwar Hussain, Sunan Abu Dawud with Muzaffar Hussain and Al-Aqidah al-Tahawiyyah with Muhammad Asadullah. He studied Mishkat al-Masabih with Muzaffar Hussain up to the chapter of "major sins" and then completed it with Muhammad Yunus Jaunpuri.

He was a disciple of Talha Kandhlawi.

Career
Mazahiri began teaching at Mazahir Uloom in 1968. In 1972, he taught Tafsir al-Jalalayn and in 1976, became hadith professor in the seminary and taught Mishkat al-Masabih.
The managing committee of Mazahir Uloom Jadeed appointed him Vice Chancellor in 1992. Later on 30 July 1996, Mazahiri became the Chancellor. Talha Kandhlawi appointed him as the manager (Sajjada Nashin) of the khanqah of Muhammad Zakariyya Kandhlawi.

In 2007, Mazahiri rejected the idea of Central Madrasa Board in India. He was a board member of the All India Muslim Personal Law Board and Darul Uloom Nadwatul Ulama.

Death
Mazahiri died on 20 July 2020. Jamiat Ulama-e-Hind President, Arshad Madani expressed grief by saying that Mazahiri's death was a tragedy for Indian Muslims.

Family life
Mazahiri was the son-in-law of Muhammad Zakariyya Kandhlawi. Tablighi Jamat leader Muhammad Saad Kandhlavi is Mazahiri's son-in-law.

References

2020 deaths
Deobandis
Indian Sunni Muslim scholars of Islam
1946 births
Mazahir Uloom alumni